Rainer Pelkonen (born 19 April 1928) is a Finnish hurdler. He competed in the men's 400 metres hurdles at the 1952 Summer Olympics.

References

1928 births
Living people
Athletes (track and field) at the 1952 Summer Olympics
Finnish male hurdlers
Olympic athletes of Finland
Place of birth missing (living people)